Drum Corps Europe (DCE) is a governing body for all-age drum and bugle corps based in Biddinghuizen, Netherlands. DCE coordinates the European Music Games, including the annual European Championships, in cooperation with strategic partners from the United Kingdom, Ireland, and Germany. DCE also hosts the Dutch Music Games which were previously hosted by the defunct Drum Corps Nederland (DCN). Also known as European Drum Corps Association (EDCA).

The DCE European Championships have been hosted at Parkstad Limburg Stadion in Kerkrade since 2008. In January 2020, DCE announced it would not organize a Championship event in 2020 due to insufficient corps registrations. Several European drum corps associations, including Drum Corps United Kingdom, jointly announced a substitute championships tentatively scheduled for September 2020. The European Drum Corps Championship was hosted at Stadion Krommedijk in Dordrecht on 26 September 2022. The first European championship in two years.

DCE was reorganized in 2018 following a brief closure in 2017. The European Music Games (EMG) Judging Guide, utilized by other governing bodies within Europe, is developed and published by DCE's adjudicators.

History 
DCE was founded in 2000 with the goal of developing the drum corps activity in Europe. Founding members opted to codify as few rules of competition as possible as a means of encouraging growth. The first European Championships were hosted at the Arteveldestadion in Ghent, Belgium on 26 May 2001. West Coast Sound, from Haarlem, was crowned the inaugural European champion.

European Music Games 
In 2006, DCE announced it would cooperate with other drum corps associations in Europe to develop a standardized adjudication manual and adjudicator training. The result was the creation of the European Music Games format in 2008.

Affiliates 
 Dutch Music Games (DMG), formerly Drum Corps Nederland (DCN)
 Drum Corps United Kingdom (DCUK)
 Irish Marching Band Association (IMBA)
  (Rastede Music Days Festival), Rastede, Germany
 German Open, Hamelin, Germany

Reorganization 
Following the 2017 European Championships, DCE executives announced the immediate suspension of operations. Reasons given were dwindling personnel, and the fiscal pressure of hosting an international event. In December, a new association was established, the European Drum Corps Association (EDCA), with the intention of replacing DCE. On 23 January 2018, the EDCA received approval to continue operations as Drum Corps Europe.

Prior to the reorganization, DCE operated as a private foundation which limited the ability of participating drum corps to improve the adjudication and competitive attributes of sanctioned events. The new structure, as an association, is similar to other governing bodies in the activity, such as Drum Corps Associates (DCA) in the United States. Participating corps will have a "direct say" in governance and adjudication.

In January 2020, DCE announced it would not organize a European Championship due to insufficient corps registrations. Other European drum corps associations and presenting partners, including Drum Corps United Kingdom, jointly announced a substitute championship tentatively scheduled for September 2020. After a two year delay due to world events, the European Drum Corps Championship was hosted at Stadion Krommedijk in Dordrecht on 26 September 2022. The event was organized and presented by the Dutch Music Games. The championship included a new Concert Class, which is similar to DCA's Mini-corps Class.

Participating corps 
Below is a list of competitors at the most recent European Championships (2018). The list includes Dutch Music Games (DMG) competing corps.

Source:

Premier Class

Junior Class

Inactive corps

Classification and adjudication 
Classes available at DCE sanctioned competitions are broadly defined, keeping with the founding ideology of "as few rules as possible". Competitions that utilize DCE's adjudication manual are often billed as "European Music Games" (EMG).

Classes 
Premier Class corps are groups who compete at the national, or international, level. There is no age limit for this class.

A Class corps are groups with inexperienced participants.

Junior Class corps are groups with young participants, and is limited to groups whose participants are no older than sixteen years of age.

Concert Class corps are groups who wish to compete in a concert setting, similar to DCA's mini-corps format.

Adjudication 
DCE's adjudication manual is based on three broad categories: Music, Visual and Effect. Each of the categories are further subdivided into reference criteria, or captions. All sanctioned competitions require nine adjudicators, including an adjudicator responsible for Timing & Penalties.

The adjudication manual in use by Drum Corps Associates (DCA) prior to 2001 was adapted for use by DCE. DCA's manual was also adapted for use by Drum Corps United Kingdom (DCUK) and Drum Corps Nederland (DCN) between 2001 and 2004. Each governing body made changes to better reflect the state of competition among their members corps. By 2006, the accumulated changes prevented corps from competing across the continent, as the reference criteria were no longer compatible, nor were the posted scores easily comparable.

In 2006, DCE developed a "European Music Games" adjudication manual, with input from other European judges associations. The name was inspired by Drum Corps International's "Summer Music Games" moniker. In 2010, DCA modified its adjudication manual removing the analysis captions, rendering it incompatible with the DCE manual.

Past champions 
DCE realigned its class system in 2001, 2007, and in 2022.

See also 
 Drum Corps Associates
 Drum Corps International
 Winter Guard International

Notes

References

External links 
 
 
 

Drum and bugle corps
2000 establishments in Europe
Organizations established in 2000